Oracle Advertising, formerly Datalogix, is a cloud-based consumer data collection, activation, and measurement platform for use by digital advertisers. Datalogix was a consumer data collection company based in Westminster, Colorado that provided offline consumer spending data to marketers. In December 2014, Oracle signed an agreement to acquire Datalogix. After the acquisition, Datalogix's name changed to Oracle Data Cloud, which later became Oracle Advertising. Oracle Advertising is part of the Oracle Advertising and Customer Experience (CX) application suite.

This collected data, which include purchase data from stores, credit cards, and loyalty cards, helps marketing teams determine their ad campaigns' effectiveness and those that will potentially increase profits, with Datalogix clients including retail stores, grocers, travel agencies, PepsiCo, Ford, and the Dr. Pepper Snapple Group. After consumer spending behaviors are measured, the information is sold to advertising companies and publishers, such as Facebook, Google, Twitter, Snapchat, and Pinterest. Advertisers then use the information obtained to tailor online ads and reach new or existing customers. In turn, publishers use the data to determine the amount of profit advertisers earned and to convince them to purchase more ads that will feature on their websites. Advertisers and publishers have used Datalogix to help increase profits, as the use of digital media continues to expand.

In 2017, Oracle also acquired Moat, an ad measurement company, which also became part of Oracle Data Cloud, now Oracle Advertising. The Moat acquisition added measurement and analytics capabilities to allow advertisers to track and measure media, as well as the performance of interactions with online ads.

BlueKai, acquired by Oracle in 2014, is a cloud-based data collection platform that uses website cookies to collect online tracking data. The tracking data is then used by marketers to target users with ads specific to their interests, behavior patterns, or demographics. BlueKai is part of Oracle Marketing.

Privacy issues with consumer data collection
Some consumers and agencies are against companies that use Datalogix because it brings into question the issue of consent, as a vast majority of consumers do not want their information collected, measured, or sold. The FTC was involved to investigate a deal between Datalogix and Facebook, to see if it violated privacy issues. Datalogix obtains data from Facebook users by matching e-mail addresses from a Customer Relationship Management database (CRM), along with additional information people use to create personal Facebook accounts, in order to tailor specific audiences for advertisers. Datalogix tailors specific audiences by grouping consumers together according to their similar interests, behavior patterns, or demographics. The company reports that it keeps the information anonymous and gives consumers the option to opt out of data collecting and reporting by selecting the opt-out option on their website.

Funding

In May 2014, Datalogix raised $45 million Series C round led by Wellington Management Company. This round, joined by existing investor IVP, brought Datalogix to $86.5 million in funding plus an undisclosed round raised from Breyer Capital. In April 2013, the company raised $25 million.

See also 

 BlueKai
 Oracle Advertising and Customer Experience (CX)
 Oracle Corporation

References

Companies based in Denver
Data collection
Data brokers
Oracle acquisitions
2014 mergers and acquisitions